Hüseyin Atalay (born 27 October 1991) is a Turkish footballer who plays as a midfielder for Bursa Yıldırımspor.

References

External links
 
 

1991 births
Living people
Turkish footballers
Association football midfielders
Antalyaspor footballers
Denizlispor footballers
Karşıyaka S.K. footballers
Fethiyespor footballers
Süper Lig players
TFF First League players
TFF Second League players